Savović is a Serbian surname. It may refer to:

Boban Savović (born 1979), basketball player
Boris Savović (born 1987), basketball player
Branimir Savović, politician
Milenko Savović (born 1960), basketball player
Predrag Savović (born 1976), basketball player

Serbian surnames